Skipness is a village on the east coast of Kintyre in Scotland, located just over  south of Tarbert and facing the Isle of Arran.

There is Skipness Castle (a ruined castle) and Kilbrannan Chapel, which contains some rare grave slabs. There is a nearby cafe that serves fresh fish from the area, and beer brewed on Arran, which can be seen from anywhere in Skipness. Also in the area, there is an organic tannery. There are cottages available to rent in Port na Chrò near the village that are situated by a beach. Both the castle and the chapel date from the 13th century, and are maintained by Historic Scotland.

Many of the cottages which can be rented have their own boats and, during the summer months, mackerel and pollack can be caught from them as well as a whole host of other species. There are plenty of walks running from and through Skipness, and many shorter ones are located in the picturesque Skipness Estate (which rents out cottages and serves the seafood). Although Skipness is a tiny village with only one shop, it serves the basics, and there are other communities nearby such as Tarbert and Campbeltown from which groceries can be bought.

External links

Community Website
Skipness Official tourist website
Skipness
Skipness Castle
Historic Scotland: Skipness Castle

Villages in Kintyre